Aeternitas (minor planet designation: 446 Aeternitas) is a main belt asteroid. It was discovered by Max Wolf and A. Schwassmann on 27 October 1899 in Heidelberg. It is classified as an A-type asteroid. The asteroid is roughly 45 km in diameter and has a high albedo.

References

External links
 
 

Background asteroids
Aeternitas
Aeternitas
Aeternitas
A-type asteroids (Tholen)
A-type asteroids (SMASS)
18991027